Intermediate cleaving peptidase 55 (Icp55, mitochondrial intermediate cleaving peptidase 55 kDa) is an enzyme. This enzyme catalyses the following chemical reaction

 The enzyme cleaves the Pro36-Pro37 bond of cysteine desulfurase (EC 2.8.1.7) removing three amino acid residues (Tyr-Ser-Pro) from the N-terminus after cleavage by mitochondrial processing peptidase.

Icp55 removes the destabilizing N-terminal amino acid residues.

References

External links 
 

EC 3.4.11